The Autonomous State Entities and Decentralized Services are two types of government-owned corporations typical of the Uruguayan state.

According to Section XI of the Constitution of Uruguay, their legal personality is subject to public law.

Autonomous State Entities
 Administración Nacional de Usinas y Trasmisiones Eléctricas (UTE)
 Administración Nacional de Combustibles, Alcohol y Portland (ANCAP)
 State Railways Administration of Uruguay (AFE)
 Instituto Nacional de Colonización (INC)
 Banco de la República Oriental del Uruguay (BROU)
 Banco Hipotecario del Uruguay (BHU)
 Central Bank of Uruguay (BCU)
 Banco de Seguros del Estado (BSE)
 Banco de Previsión Social (BPS)
 University of the Republic (UdelaR)
 Administración Nacional de Educación Pública (ANEP)

Decentralized Services
 Administración Nacional de Puertos (ANP)
 Administración Nacional de Telecomunicaciones (ANTEL)
 Administración de los Servicios de Salud del Estado (ASSE)
 Instituto del Niño y el Adolescente del Uruguay (INAU)
 Administración Nacional de Correos (ANC)
 Obras Sanitarias del Estado (OSE)
 Agencia Nacional de Vivienda (ANV)

References

 
Economy of Uruguay
Government of Uruguay